Finding Home is a 2003 American romantic drama film starring Geneviève Bujold, Lisa Brenner, Louise Fletcher and Johnny Messner.  The film marked the last full-length feature film appearance of actor Jason Miller.

Plot

This is a story about family, love, and loss. It follows a young woman named Amanda (Lisa Brenner), and her journey in rediscovering the past. After finding out her grandmother (Louise Fletcher) has died, she finds herself inheriting her grandmothers B&B located on a small island. Going back to the island digs up mixed emotions and memories that Amanda must work through, while figuring out whether or not to sell the B&B. During her stay at the B&B, Amanda uncovers her grandmothers past and gets to the bottom of what really happened the summer she was forced to leave the island she once loved.

Cast
Lisa Brenner as Amanda
Misha Collins as Dave
Geneviève Bujold as Katie
Louise Fletcher as Esther
Jeannetta Arnette as Grace
Sherri Saum as Candace
Johnny Messner as Nick
Andrew Lukich as CJ
Justin Henry as Prescott
Jason Miller as Lester Brownlow
Jennifer O'Kain as Young Esther
Laura Thoren as Young Amanda
Kyle Gallner as Young Dave
Alexandra Palmari as Little Amanda
Sandy Ward as Julian the Lobsterman
William Bookston as Chuck the Postman
Sean Blodgett as Delivery Boy

Reception
The film has a 30% rating on Rotten Tomatoes.  Norm Schrager of Contactmusic.com awarded the film one and a half stars out of five.  Roger Ebert awarded the film one star.

References

External links
 
 

American romantic drama films
2000s English-language films
2000s American films